Andrea Longoni (born 5 May 1983) is an Italian sports journalist and television presenter of .

Biography
Longoni was born in Carate Brianza, Italy. As a child, when asked what he wanted to be when he became an adult, he didn't give the usual Italian answer of football player; he insisted from the start that he wanted to be a sports journalist. His first media-related employment was with Radio Seregno, where he co-hosted a program. In 2006 he moved to Telelombardia.

References

1983 births
Italian journalists
Italian male journalists
People from Brianza
Living people